The Baltimore and Ohio Railroad's sole class V-2 4-6-4 steam locomotive, No. 2 Lord Baltimore, was constructed by the railroad's own Mount Clare shops in 1935. It was built under the direction of the road's master mechanic George Emerson, and said to have been inspired by the English locomotive (GWR 6000 Class 6000 King George V) which had appeared at B&O's 1927 Fair of the Iron Horse. The locomotive was constructed with an experimental water tube firebox, and operated at 350 psi when more typical operating pressure was 250 psi. The 84-inch drive wheels were the biggest ever on B&O steam. It was constructed to haul a new lightweight train, the Royal Blue, between New York City and Washington, DC.  Later that year it was sent to the B&O-owned Chicago and Alton Railroad.  It returned to the B&O in 1942 and, after work in B&O's shops, was renumbered to #5340 and assigned to service between Washington, DC and Cumberland, Maryland. Shortly afterward, it was withdrawn from service and stored at the railroad's shops in Baltimore, Maryland, and was scrapped in 1949.

List Of Baltimore and Ohio V Class 4-6-4

Class V1 #5047 (Rebuilt from P-1c Pacific at B&O Shops in 1933. Scrapped 1950)

Class V3 #5350 (Built by B&O’s Mount Clare Shops in 1935. Scrapped 1950)

Class V4 #5360 (Built by B&O’s Mount Clare Shops in 1935. Scrapped 1950)

The Class V1 #5047 and New Builds 4-6-4’s 

In 1933 the B&O rebuilt P-1c Pacific #5047 as a Class V1 4-6-4 at its own shops in 1933, keeping the same number #5047. In 1935 the B&O built a Class V3 4-6-4 #5350 using its own shops. In 1936 the Railroad built a Class V4 #5360 another 4-6-4. In 1949 Lord Baltimore was retired from service and scrapped, the Class V1 was scrapped in 1950 and so were the Classes V3 and V4. There are no surviving V Class 4-6-4 Hudson Types.

References 

 

V-2
4-6-4 locomotives
Individual locomotives of the United States
Railway locomotives introduced in 1935
Steam locomotives of the United States
Scrapped locomotives
Unique locomotives
Passenger locomotives